Dalibor Poldrugač (born 23 April 1975) is a Croatian association football coach and former professional player. He coaches the U15s at Dinamo Zagreb Academy.

Club career 
On 16 June 2009 Poldrugač signed a new two-year contract with NK Slaven Belupo. He said he was "pleased to be playing in a club with so many young players and that he would be glad to help them develop even better". After an 18-year-long career spent entirely in Croatia, he retired on 21.5.2011 in a game against NK Osijek

Honours 
Dinamo Zagreb
 Prva HNL: 2003
 Croatian Cup: 2004
 Croatian Supercup: 2003

NK Zagreb
 Prva HNL: 2002

References

External links 
 Dalibor Poldrugač profile at Nogometni Magazin 

1975 births
Living people
People from Umag
Association football midfielders
Croatian footballers
GNK Dinamo Zagreb players
NK Dubrava players
NK Samobor players
NK Slaven Belupo players
HNK Segesta players
NK Croatia Sesvete players
NK Zagreb players
Croatian Football League players
First Football League (Croatia) players